I'm Sorry, I Love You is a 2004 South Korean television drama series starring So Ji-sub and Im Soo-jung. It aired on KBS2 from November 8 to December 28, 2004, on Mondays and Tuesdays for 16 episodes.

Synopsis
Cha Moo-hyuk is a part-time scam artist working the streets of Australia. He was abandoned by his parents as a child and adopted by a couple in Australia. However, he was mistreated by his foster parents and thus roams the streets, cheating tourists out of their money. It is through one of these scams that he bumps into Song Eun-chae.

Eun-chae is the fashion coordinator and childhood friend of famous Korean singer, Choi Yoon. She sees Yoon as her life's focal point and does everything she can to please him. Yoon visits Melbourne, Australia to do a photoshoot with another famous Korean actress, Kang Min-joo. Yoon asks Eun-chae to get him close to Min-joo. It breaks Eun-chae's heart but she does so. One day, Eun-chae's luggage and money are stolen by the same band of criminals as Moo-hyuk.

Tired, hungry and helpless, she wanders the streets until she bumps into Moo-hyuk who, moved by her plight, manages to find the stuff stolen by his gang and return it to her. She returns to Korea and bumps into Min-joo and Yoon, who are now a couple.

Several weeks later, Moo-hyuk receives an invitation to his ex-girlfriend's wedding. At the wedding, he is accidentally shot twice in the head when someone attempts an assassination on his ex-girlfriend's husband. The doctor saves him but can only remove one bullet. The remaining bullet is lodged too deeply and cannot be surgically removed. It's killing him, and he has no longer than a year to live. Guilt-stricken, his ex-girlfriend gives him a stash of cash and tells him to go back to his native Korea to find his birth parents. He does so, and finds out that his mother is famous Korean actress, Audrey. Her son is Choi Yoon and both mother and son are adored by the public.

Moo-hyuk can't help but feel betrayed because his mother is doing so well in life, whilst he was suffering and has little time left. He vows revenge and starts by getting close to Yoon, becoming his road manager. He plots to bring Yoon and his mother down, but also falls in love with Eun-chae. Yoon becomes injured in a car accident; he will die without a heart transplant. Moo-hyuk is suddenly faced with the decision of saving his brother or letting him die as revenge.

Moo-hyuk finds out that his mother did not abandon him. His mother had an affair with a married man, and Audrey's parents instructed Eun-chae's father (then Audrey's chauffeur) to give away Moo-hyuk and his twin sister as soon as they were born. Audrey was not cognizant of the fact that she had given birth to twins, and was simply told that her child had died. Eun-chae's father thought he was "saving" Audrey's reputation. Audrey had adopted Yoon in memory of her son.

Eun-chae's father admits to the truth and tells him he is willing to accept any punishment. Moo-hyuk tells Eun-chae's father that one day he will receive a punishment.

Moo-hyuk kills himself in a motorcycle accident so that his heart can be transplanted into Yoon. Before his death, he calls Eun-chae and tells her, "I'm sorry. I love you." His heart is given to Yoon, who makes a full recovery. One year later, a heartbroken Eun-chae goes to Melbourne and to his grave, and dies next to it with a small red bottle, leading the viewer to believe she committed suicide by drinking poison. This is the punishment that Eun-chae's father receives - the death of his own daughter.

Cast

Main
 So Ji-sub as Cha Moo-hyuk
 Im Soo-jung as Song Eun-chae
 Jung Kyung-ho as Choi Yoon
 Seo Ji-young as Kang Min-joo
 Lee Hye-young as Oh Deul-hee or "Audrey" (Yoon's mother)

Supporting
 Jeon Hye-jin as Yoon Seo-kyung
 Shin Goo as Min Hyun-seok
 Lee Young-ha as Song Dae-cheon (Eun-chae's father)
 Park Gun-woo as Kim Gal-chi (Seo-kyung's son)
 Kim Hye-ok as Jang Hye-sook
 Ok Ji-young as Song Sook-chae (Eun-chae's older sister)
 Jung Hwa-young as Song Min-chae (Eun-chae's younger sister)
 Choi Yeo-jin as Moon Ji-young
 David No as assassin

Others 
 Shin Dong-wook (ep. #1)

Soundtrack

The original soundtrack of the series was released as two parts by BMG (KR). The first part was released on November 15, 2004 and the second one on December 24, 2004.

Track listing

Ratings

Source: TNSMK Media Korea

Awards and nominations

In popular culture
In episode 29 of SBS TV's My Absolute Boyfriend, the line "Will you eat with me or live with me?" is mentioned to have came from this drama. The main actors, So Ji-sub and Im Soo-jung were also mentioned.

International broadcast
 Vietnam: The series began airing on October 11, 2005 on HTV9 at 5:00 p.m.
 Japan: The series began airing on May 17, 2006 on TV Tokyo, from Monday to Thursday at 12:30 a.m.
 Thailand: The series began airing on September 27, 2008 on Channel 3, from Saturday to Sunday at 1:00 a.m. on Saturdays and 0:30 a.m. on Sundays.

Animation
G&G Entertainment released a 35-minute animated version of the drama, titled Between of One Year, consisting of highlights from the drama and new scenes dealing with the year following Moo-hyuk's death and before Eun-chae commits suicide. The script was supervised by the writer of the original live-action drama, Lee Kyung-hee. It was released on DVD on February 6, 2008.

Remakes
 Bir Aşk Hikayesi (lit. "A Love Story"), starring Seçkin Özdemir and Damla Sönmez, is a Turkish remake that aired on Fox TV beginning March 26, 2013.
 Sorry, I Love You (对不起，我爱你) is a Chinese remake that was released on January 3, 2014.
 In Thailand, a remake under the title ขอโทษที่รักเธอ (lit. "Sorry, I Love You") began airing on March 2, 2016 on ONE HD, from Wednesday to Thursday at 8:00 p.m.-9:30 p.m.
 In Japan it was remade by TBS as Gomen, Aishiteru (ごめん、愛してる), starring Tomoya Nagase, Shinobu Otake and Kentaro Sakaguchi.

References

External links
 I'm Sorry, I Love You official KBS website 
 
 
 

2004 South Korean television series debuts
2004 South Korean television series endings
Korean Broadcasting System television dramas
Television series about adoption
South Korean romance television series
South Korean melodrama television series
South Korean television series remade in other languages
Television shows written by Lee Kyung-hee